Danilo Moreno Asprilla (born 12 January 1989) is a Colombian footballer who plays as a winger for Israeli Premier League club Beitar Jerusalem.

Career
Asprilla began his career playing for Brazilian club Esporte Clube Juventude in 2008 and for Qatari club Al-Shahania Sports Club the next year. He returned to his native Colombia for the 2010 season, playing for the club Deportivo Pereira.

Litex Lovech
On 20 December 2013, Asprilla signed for Bulgarian club Litex Lovech. He marked his competitive debut by netting two goals in Litex's 3–0 league win over Beroe Stara Zagora on 23 February 2014.

Al Ain
On 4 January 2016 he moved to Al-Ain for an undisclosed fee. He made a debut on 8 January 2016 coming on as a substitute in the place of Ibrahim Diaky and scoring the winning goal in the 93 minute for 2–1 win against Al Dhafra FC.

Al-Shabab
Asprilla joined Al-Shabab in 2019. He scored his debut goal in the 2:1 win over Al Fateh in August 2019. Asprilla established himself as an important part of the side.

Al-Qadsiah
In October 2020, he moved to Al-Qadsiah.

Career statistics

Club

Honours
Hapoel Be'er Sheva
State Cup (1): 2021–22

References

External links
 
 
 Profile at Tenfield Digital 

1989 births
Living people
Colombian footballers
Colombian expatriate footballers
Deportivo Pereira footballers
Rampla Juniors players
Independiente Santa Fe footballers
Patriotas Boyacá footballers
Al-Shahania SC players
PFC Litex Lovech players
Al Ain FC players
Al-Fayha FC players
Al-Shabab FC (Riyadh) players
Al-Qadsiah FC players
Hapoel Be'er Sheva F.C. players
Beitar Jerusalem F.C. players
Categoría Primera A players
First Professional Football League (Bulgaria) players
UAE Pro League players
Qatari Second Division players
Saudi Professional League players
Israeli Premier League players
Expatriate footballers in Uruguay
Expatriate footballers in Bulgaria
Expatriate footballers in the United Arab Emirates
Expatriate footballers in Qatar
Expatriate footballers in Saudi Arabia
Expatriate footballers in Israel
Colombian expatriate sportspeople in Uruguay
Colombian expatriate sportspeople in Bulgaria
Colombian expatriate sportspeople in the United Arab Emirates
Colombian expatriate sportspeople in Qatar
Colombian expatriate sportspeople in Saudi Arabia
Colombian expatriate sportspeople in Israel
Footballers from Medellín
Association football wingers